Statistics of the Primera División de México for the 1955–56 season.

Overview

Atlas (Segunda División 1954-55 Champion), Zamora and Cuautla (second and third place in a promotional tournament in Segunda División) were promoted to Primera División, to increase the number of teams to 14 clubs.

The season was contested by 14 teams, and León won the championship.

Zamora was relegated to Segunda División.

Teams

League standings

Results

Championship playoff

References
Mexico - List of final tables (RSSSF)

1955-56
Mex
1955–56 in Mexican football